The 1976 United States presidential election in Montana was part of the 1976 United States presidential election, which took place on November 2, 1976. Voters chose four representatives, or electors to the Electoral College, who voted for president and vice president.

Montana voted for the Republican nominee, President Gerald Ford, over the Democratic nominee, former Georgia Governor Jimmy Carter. Ford won Montana by a margin of 7.44%. , this is the last election in which McCone County and Wibaux County voted for a Democratic Presidential candidate. Carter became the first ever Democrat to win the White House without carrying Daniels, Judith Basin, Pondera, Teton, or Toole Counties, as well as the first to do so without carrying Cascade County since Grover Cleveland in 1892, and the first to do so without carrying Chouteau or Valley Counties since Woodrow Wilson in 1912.

Results

Results by county

See also
 United States presidential elections in Montana

References

Montana
1976
1976 Montana elections